Figgas 4 Life is the only studio album by American hip hop group Major Figgas. It was released on June 30, 2000 through RuffNation Records. Production was handled by HotRunner, Darnell Marshall, Dean Murder, Lee Johnson, Leon Kidd, Melvin Carter and Cedric "Smitty" Smith. It features the lone guest appearance from Kenny Whitehead. The album peaked at number 115 on the Billboard 200, number 29 on the Top R&B/Hip-Hop Albums and number 3 on the Top Heatseekers. Its lead single "Yeah That's Us" made it to number thirty on the Hot R&B/Hip-Hop Songs and number two on the Hot Rap Songs.

Critical reception
AllMusic wrote: "With at least seven rappers working in various combinations, the group varies its sound effectively. Unfortunately, beyond musical interest, there is little but the usual nomenclature of gangsta rap to be found in the actual words". The Morning Call called the album "a fairly ho-hum affair from these Philly natives, only punctuated by some sterling production that is never matched by either passion or innovation on the lyrical bent".

Track listing

Personnel

Far'd "Gillie Da Kid" Nasir – songwriter (tracks: 2-4, 8-13, 16), executive producer
Rennard "AB Liva" East – songwriter (tracks: 2, 3, 5-7, 9, 11, 13, 14, 16)
Asa "Spade" Burbage – songwriter (tracks: 2-5, 9-12, 16)
Antonio "Dutch" Walker – songwriter (tracks: 2, 3, 5, 6, 10, 12, 13)
Michael Allen – songwriter (tracks: 2, 5, 9, 11-13, 16)
Bianca Jones – songwriter (tracks: 2, 5, 8, 9, 16)
M. Brown – songwriter (tracks: 2, 11, 14, 15)
T. Tailor – songwriter (tracks: 3, 6, 14)
T. Wooden – songwriter (tracks: 7, 14)
M. Woods – songwriter (track 1)
L. Smith – songwriter (track 6)
S. Allen – songwriter (track 14)
Kenny Whitehead – guest performer (track 12)
Terrance "HotRunner" Lovelace – producer (tracks: 2, 5, 9, 16), mixing (track 16)
Leon Kidd – producer (track 3)
Lee Johnson – producer (track 4)
Darnell Marshall – producer (tracks: 6, 12, 14)
Dean Murder – producer (tracks: 7, 8, 11, 13)
Melvin "Ruggedness" Carter – producer (track 10)
Cedric "Smitty" Smith – producer (track 16)
Brian Bricklin – additional producer (tracks: 3, 4)
Ian Cross – additional producer (tracks: 3, 4), recording (tracks: 2, 4, 9), mixing (tracks: 2, 3, 9), engineering (track 16)
Warren Riker – mixing (tracks: 4, 16)
Christof – engineering assistant (track 9)
Chris Schwartz – executive producer
Marcus Graham – executive producer
Etre Creative Services – design

Charts

References

External links

2000 debut albums
Major Figgas albums
Warner Records albums